Morgan Wade (BMX rider) (born 1983), American BMX rider
 Morgan Wade (singer) (born 1995), American country music singer